Alstom Ferroviaria S.p.A., former Fiat Ferroviaria S.p.A., is the Italian division of Alstom. Fiat Ferroviaria S.p.A. was the rail division of automobile manufacturer Fiat. It was founded in 1880 as Società Nazionale Officine di Savigliano. Fiat Ferroviaria began building locomotives in the 1930s. It became part of Fiat in 1970. Fiat Ferroviaria acquired the rail business of SIG of Switzerland in 1995, forming the subsidiary Fiat-Sig. The company had previously owned Argentine company Materfer until 1998, which now operates as an independent company.

In June 2000 Alstom purchased a 51% shareholding.

Overview 

During the 1960s and 1970s, Fiat Ferroviaria developed a tilting technology for trains and was the first (and the only one for several decades) to produce active tilting trains with the trademark of Pendolino.

In Italy several classes of Pendolinos were adopted starting from 1976 (ETR 401, ETR 450, ETR 460-65, ETR 480-85 and the Alstom made ETR600.

Following the success of the ETR 450 series introduced in Italy in 1988 (the 401 series introduced in 1976 consisted of only 2 trainsets and never operated regular commercial service, working more like an "on-wheel laboratory"), tilting systems including bogies, traction, electric and electronic equipment were ordered by several countries:

 Germany (ICE T)
 Finland (VR Class Sm3 and VR Class Sm6)
 Switzerland (Cisalpino)
 Spain (Alaris)
 Portugal (Alfa Pendular)
 Slovenia (SŽ series 310)
 Czech Republic (ČD Class 680)

In February 1999, Virgin Trains West Coast ordered a fleet of Class 390s from Alstom that incorporated Fiat Ferroviaria tilting technology.

Directly or indirectly, 18 countries throughout the world applied the Italian Fiat Ferroviaria tilting technology to their trains, including the United States and China.

See also
 Pendolino family of tilting trains, built by Fiat Ferroviaria
 Materfer, Argentine factory of licensed Fiat rolling stock
 Fiat Materfer 7131, railcars built by the company for Argentine urban services

References

External Links

 
Alstom
Fiat
Italian brands
Locomotive manufacturers of Italy
Rolling stock manufacturers of Italy
Vehicle manufacturing companies established in 1917
Vehicle manufacturing companies disestablished in 2000
1917 establishments in Italy
2000 disestablishments in Italy